Patrik Enberg (born June 11, 1994) is a Swedish ice hockey player. He is currently playing with Skellefteå AIK of the Swedish Hockey League (SHL).

Enberg made his Swedish Hockey League debut playing with Skellefteå AIK during the 2013–14 SHL season.

References

External links

1994 births
Living people
People from Arvidsjaur Municipality
Skellefteå AIK players
Swedish ice hockey left wingers
Sportspeople from Norrbotten County